Henry Lee Johnson (1964 – January 20, 1980) was a 15-year-old African-American who was murdered in Idabel, Oklahoma by a white man in 1980 after entering the parking lot of the Black Hat Club. His murder led to a race riot in Idabel that left two more men dead.

The murder 
The Black Hat Club in Idabel, Oklahoma was a whites-only club on the outskirts of the Black side of town. In the weeks leading up to the murder, there had been other racial incidents at the club. In the early hours of Sunday, January 20, 1980, Henry Lee Johnson, his 13-year-old brother Victor Johnson, and a group of other boys entered the parking lot through a hole in the gate. They were chased by Walter Anthony 'Tony' DeShazo, a white man from Horatio, Arkansas, who fired several shots in their direction. The group of boys ran away and discovered that Henry Lee Johnson was no longer with them. They returned the next morning to look for him, which was when his body was discovered.

The riots 
Immediately following the discovery of Henry Lee Johnson's body, rumors began to circulate, including that the youth was severely beaten and lynched. This angered the Black community and led to rioting. Several businesses were burned down, including the Black Hat Club. During the riots, two men, William Mack Jr., Black, and Idabel auxiliary police officer Ruben Farmer, white, were both killed, In the days following the riots, the Ku Klux Klan were in Idabel passing out flyers and recruiting new members. Investigators concluded that William Mack Jr. and Ruben Farmer had shot each other.

Walter Anthony 'Tony' DeShazo, from a prominent family in Horatio, turned himself in and confessed to the murder on January 21, 1980. He was charged with first-degree murder and bonded out for $25,000 on January 23, 1980.

In October of 1980, another Black man, Billy Richards was shot and killed by police, and his companion and a White police officer were also shot but survived.

The trial 
In September 1980, District Judge Gail Craytor downgraded Tony DeShazo's charges to second-degree murder, citing no proof of premeditation or malice. Sitting Oklahoma Senator Gene Stipe was the lead defense attorney for DeShazo. 

During the trial, a pregnant 13-year-old girl testified on behalf of DeShazo. The girl, from Foreman, Arkansas, testified that she was there with DeShazo and two other people. She testified that she exited the van to use the restroom, heard a noise, and saw three Black males. She went back to the van and told the others, "There is someone out there". DeShazo took a gun out of a gun case, then he and Ronnie Ayres, another one of the van's occupants, got out of the car and went around the building. The 13-year old testified she heard DeShazo yell "Stop", and shots being fired.

Victor Johnson testified at the trial that the boys heard a man yell "Freeze or I'll shoot". The boys kept running and the man shot. Thad Gillis, the club's security guard, testified that he saw a nude woman standing next to the van DeShazo and his companions were in right before he heard the shots.

The murder confession was never seen or heard by the jury, as Associate Judge H. F. Followell refused to allow prosecutors to present it. Senator Stripe told the jury that another man, Frank Murphy, in another van was there that night and implicated him in the murder. Murphy denied any involvement.

In January 1981, DeShazo was acquitted of all charges. No other person was ever arrested in connection with the murder.

References 

1980 in Oklahoma
1980 murders in the United States
Deaths by firearm in Oklahoma
Deaths by person in Oklahoma
Incidents of violence against boys
January 1980 events in the United States
Male murder victims
McCurtain County, Oklahoma
Murdered American children
People murdered in Oklahoma
Racially motivated violence against African Americans
African-American history of Oklahoma